Pelosinus is a genus of Bacillota bacteria classified within the class Negativicutes.

Phylogeny
The currently accepted taxonomy is based on the List of Prokaryotic names with Standing in Nomenclature (LPSN) and National Center for Biotechnology Information (NCBI)

See also
 List of bacterial orders
 List of bacteria genera

References

Negativicutes
Gram-negative bacteria
Bacteria genera